The Citizens Band is a New York City based political cabaret troupe. The band is made up of different rotating cast members that perform and often includes celebrities in their shows. Past participants have been Zoe Kravitz, Zooey Deschanel, Mark McAdam, Aaron Conte, Adam Crystal, Rain Phoenix, Maggie Gyllenhaal and Nina Persson. Founding members of the band include Sarah Sophie Flicker, Karen Elson, Jorjee Douglass, Rachelle Garniez, Chelsea Bacon and Adam Dugas.

In September 2012 The Citizens Band released their debut album "Grab A Root And Growl", a "pro-democracy/ anti-voter apathy" themed recording produced by Nathan Larson.

Sources

External links
Official Web site
The Citizens Band Fan Page

American cabaret performers